My Revenge on the World is the first EP by Jennifer Parkin's project Ayria, released in 2005 on the Alfa Matrix label.

Track listing
 "My Revenge on the World" – 5:21
 "Infiltrating My Way Through the System" - 5:29
 "Cutting (Cycletribe Mix)" - 5:15
 "My Revenge on the World (Jamie Kidd Mix)" - 6:53
 "Infiltrating My Way Through the System (November Process Mix)" - 4:48
 "Cutting (PTIncision Mix)" - 6:19
 "My Device (8kHzMono Miix)" - 3:56
 "My Revenge on the World (Fractured Mix)" - 5:06
 "Infiltrating My Way Through the System (Steril Mix)" - 6:23
 "Cutting (Daniel X Mix)" - 4:47

References

2005 EPs
Ayria albums